

Hat-tricks

Notable hat-tricks

 Perpetua Nkwocha and Asisat Oshoala both of  scored 4 goals each in 2004 (Nkwocha) and 2016 (Oshoala).
  has scored the most hat-tricks (6 hat-tricks).
  has conceded the most hat-tricks (4 hat-tricks).

Hat-tricks

A hat-trick is achieved when the same player scores three or more goals in one match. Listed in chronological order.

See also

 African Footballer of the Year
 African Women's Footballer of the Year
 List of hat-tricks
 List of Africa Cup of Nations hat-tricks
 List of African Nations Championship hat-tricks
 List of sport awards
 List of sports awards honoring women

References

External link
CAF website
Africa – Women's Championship

hat-tricks
Africa Women Cup of Nations hat-tricks
Africa Women Cup of Nations hat-tricks
African Women Cup of Nations